"Got Some Teeth" is the first single from American rapper Obie Trice's debut studio album, Cheers. The song was used as the theme song for the character "Compton-Ass Terry" in the TV show Viva la Bam on MTV. "Got Some Teeth" peaked at number fifty four on the Billboard Hot 100. Outside the United States, "Got Some Teeth" peaked within the top ten of the charts in Belgium (Flanders), Denmark, Ireland, New Zealand, and United Kingdom.

Background
The song details Obie's various encounters with women in a bar. In the first verse he meets "Veronica", and invites her to Cheers and then offers her sex and various acts outside of the bar. In the second verse, Trice is enticed to approach "Karen", but doesn't due to her having a venereal disease and many children with various men. She still confronts him for a one-night stand because she doesn't want to go home to another night of masturbation, Trice agrees saying that he wouldn't want to head home with a woman who has implants. He leaves the bar to find a group of women making fun of him until he opens fire on them via a gun he had hidden in the trunk of his car. In the last verse the bar is filled with obese women and Trice feels out of place because he has a "big-girl disorder". He leaves to find another bar with thinner women and exclaims "Lean Cuisine wouldn't hurt much". The chorus details Trice's hopes of waking up after a one-night stand to a woman without fake teeth, portrayed in the video as dentures.

Music video
The music video for the song features Eminem as a bartender, "disguised" with a moustache, and Kuniva of D12 dressed as his alter ego, Rondell Beene, as another bartender, saving Obie and Kon Artis from a fat girl. The host of game show "Dream Date" in the video, which is intended to be a spoof on the television reality show "Blind Date", is played by actor Matt Sawyer, who uses his real name as the character.

Track listing
CD single

Notes
 signifies an additional producer.
 signifies a co-producer.

Chart performance
"Got Some Teeth" peaked at number fifty four on the Billboard Hot 100.

In the United Kingdom, the song entered and peaked at number eight on the UK Singles Chart on October 26, 2003.

Weekly charts

Year-end charts

Certifications

References

2003 singles
Obie Trice songs
Song recordings produced by Eminem
Shady Records singles
Songs written by Eminem
Songs written by Anne Dudley
Songs written by Trevor Horn
2003 songs
Songs written by Luis Resto (musician)